Dronryp is a village in the Dutch municipality of Waadhoeke. On 1 January 2017, it had 3,281 inhabitants.

History and architecture
Before 2018, the village was part of the Menameradiel municipality. A few centuries BC, a settlement developed around where the street Tsjerkebuorren is now (Stenvert et al., 2000). Another settlement came into existence nearby when a canal between Leeuwarden and Harlingen was completed in 1507. (Part of it was filled up in 1940.) Between roughly 1850 and 1950, these two gradually merged.

The oldest known reference to the village dates from 1132, when it was called Denningrip, meaning a "rip" (narrow stretch of land) where a family called Drenninga lived.

Of the old mansions in the area only the early 18th century Schatzenburg remains.

Miscellaneous information
The van Harinxmakanaal, completed in 1953, runs along the south side of the town. The A31 runs along the north side. Dronryp also has a railway station.

Painter Sir Lawrence Alma-Tadema was born in the house at Dûbelestreek 2, Eise Eisinga, famous for his planetarium, at Tsjerkebuorren 13.

Transportation
Dronryp railway station

Windmills
There are three windmills in Dronryp; De Poelen, Kingmatille, and the Hatsumermolen.

Gallery

References
 Stenvert, R. et al. (2000), Monumenten in Nederland: Fryslân, Waanders Uitgevers, Zwolle, the Netherlands. .

External links 

Waadhoeke
Populated places in Friesland